Federico Maria Zinelli (23 June 1805 – 24 November 1879) was an Italian Roman Catholic priest, from 1861 until his death bishop of Treviso.

A member of the De Fide Commission, Zinelli wrote the third chapter of Pastor aeternus, which defines the doctrine of papal infallibility.

Life
Of noble birth in Venice, Zinelli was ordained a deacon on 22 September 1827 and a priest on 26 December 1827. He became known for his high culture and rigid theological positions. 

In 1832, Zinelli published Dei due metodi analitico e sintetico ("Of the two methods analytical and synthetic"). He became director of the seminary of Venice, then canon theologian of St Mark's Basilica and vicar general of the Patriarchate of Venice. On 23 August 1861, the Habsburg government of the Kingdom of Lombardy–Venetia nominated him as bishop of Treviso, to succeed Giovanni Antonio Farina, and the appointment was confirmed by Pope Pius IX on 30 September.

 Zinelli took part in the First Vatican Council in Rome between 1869 and 1870, interrupted by the Capture of Rome by the forces of Raffaele Cadorna during the Risorgimento. He was appointed as a member of the De Fide Commission, chaired by Luigi Maria Cardinal Bilio, and was the author of the third chapter of Pastor aeternus, which defines the doctrine of papal infallibility.

In April 1875, Zinelli appointed Giuseppe Sarto (the future Pope Pius X) as chancellor of his diocese. In the summer of the same year he was struck down by apoplexy and was almost unable to continue as a bishop. However, he continued in office until his death in 1879, when Giuseppe Sarto issued the following statement:

The body of Zinelli was buried first in a tomb within the new church of Santa Bona di Treviso, which he had had built. In 1931, his remains were moved to the chapel of Our Lady in Treviso Cathedral and are now with those of other bishops of Treviso in the crypt.

Notes

External links
Dei due metodi analitico e sintetico discorso dell'abate Federico Maria Zinelli (Venice, 1832)

1805 births
1879 deaths
19th-century Italian Roman Catholic bishops
Bishops of Treviso
Clergy from Venice